Pelitören can refer to the following villages in Turkey:

 Pelitören, İvrindi
 Pelitören, Sındırgı